Crazy is a 2007 American biographical musical drama film co-written and directed by Rick Bieber, starring Waylon Payne and Ali Larter.

Inspired by the life of Nashville guitarist Hank Garland, the film was shot from January 13 to February 12, 2005, in Los Angeles.

Plot
Crazy is the story of a legendary guitar player who emerged from Nashville in the 1950s. Blessed with incomparable, natural talent, Hank Garland quickly established his reputation as the finest sessions player in Nashville. Artists such as Roy Orbison, Patsy Cline, The Everly Brothers, and Elvis Presley all sought Hank’s brilliant playing for their recordings. Moving effortlessly from country, to rock-a-billy, to jazz, Hank was also quickly recognized by the likes of Dave Brubeck, Gary Burton, Joe Morello, and Joe Benjamin.

The Nashville scene was a unique place in the 1950s – dominated by a small group of executives and musicians who controlled the studios, labels and unions. Hank, in his arrogance and pursuit of musical excellence, often came into conflict with the business, social and racial culture he found both restrictive and frequently frustrating.

Some people say that a near-fatal car accident, which Hank suffered, was a result of tragic response to dreams unfulfilled. Others will say that the subsequent electro-shock therapy, which was ordered by his doctors, may have contributed to ending Hank’s playing career at the age of thirty-one.  Four years later his wife dies in her own car accident.

Historians have questioned the accuracy some of the movie's points, noting that Garland was a member of Nashville's fabled "A-Team" of session players, with whom he socialized in the 1950s, and who rallied around him in the wake of his accident.

Cast

Awards
Crazy won the Best of Fest award at the Real to Reel International Film Festival in 2008.

References

External links
 
 
 
 

2007 films
2007 biographical drama films
2007 independent films
2000s American films
2000s English-language films
2000s musical drama films
American biographical drama films
American independent films
American musical drama films
Biographical films about musicians
Country music films
Cultural depictions of country musicians
Films set in the 1940s
Films set in the 1950s
Films set in 1957
Films set in the 1960s
Films set in the 1970s
Musical films based on actual events